Imitation Song is a style of Chinese typefaces modeled after a type style in Lin'an in the Southern Song Dynasty. They are technically a type of regular script typeface. It is the standard typeface used in official government documents texts in China, civil drawings in both China and Taiwan.

Name
The name of this kind of typeface varies across regions that use Chinese characters.
In Chinese, it is called fǎng Sòngtǐ (/, "imitation Song form").
In Japanese, it is called Sōchōtai ("Song Dynasty form").

Characteristics
Characteristics of imitation Song typefaces include:
The basic structure of regular script.
Relatively straight strokes, with horizontal strokes slanting up slightly.
Low stroke width variation between horizontal and vertical strokes, with strokes usually being relatively thin.
Overall geometrical regularity.

History

The printing industry from the Tang Dynasty reached an apex in the Song Dynasty, during which there were three major areas of production:
Zhejiang, where publications imitated the regular script of Ouyang Xun
Sichuan, where publications imitated the regular script of Yan Zhenqing
Fujian, where publications imitated the regular script of Liu Gongquan

When Song lost control of northern China to the Jin (金) dynasty, its capital was moved to Lin'an (modern Hangzhou), where there was a revival of printing, especially literature from Tang left in what was conquered by the Jin Dynasty. Many publishers were established in Lin'an, including Chén zhái shūjí bù (陳宅書籍鋪) established by Chen Qi, from which publications used a distinct style of regular script with orderly, straight strokes. Modern typefaces of this style are classified as imitation Song typefaces.

Imitation Song in computing

References

Chinese calligraphy
Chinese type styles